U raskoraku is a 1968 Yugoslavian drama film directed and written by Milenko Štrbac. It was entered in the 18th Berlin International Film Festival.

Cast
 Dragomir Bojanić as Jablan Jezdić
 Gizela Vuković as Dana Jezdić
 Dušan Janićijević
 Dragomir Felba as Marko
 Danilo Stojković as Postar
 Petar Božović as Veliša Jezdić 
 Jovan Janićijević Burduš
 Gojko Šantić as Bane
 Ljuba Tadić as Dica
 Dragan Zarić as Mile
 Ivan Bekjarev
 Dragomir Čumić
 Tomanija Đuričko
 Ljiljana Jovanović
 Ljiljana Lašić
 Stanislava Pešić
 Ljubiša Samardžić
 Ivan Đurđević
 Jovan Rančić

References

External links

1968 films
1968 drama films
Serbo-Croatian-language films
Serbian drama films
Serbian black-and-white films
Yugoslav black-and-white films
Yugoslav drama films